Utricularia juncea, the southern bladderwort, is a small to medium-sized, probably perennial carnivorous plant that belongs to the genus Utricularia. U. juncea is native to Central, South, and North America. It grows as a terrestrial plant in marshes, swamps, and pools in shallow waters, mostly at lower altitudes. It was originally described and published by Martin Vahl in 1804.

Synonyms 
Personula grandiflora Raf.
Stomoisia juncea (Vahl) Barnhart
S. virgatula (Barnhart) Barnhart
Utricularia angulosa Poir.
U. cornuta var. michauxii Gomez
U. juncea f. minima S.F.Blake
U. juncea f. virgatula (Barnhart) Fernald
U. personata Leconte ex Elliott
U. sclerocarpa Wright ex Sauvalle
U. simplex Wright ex Sauvalle
U. stricta G.Mey.
U. virgatula Barnhart

See also 
 List of Utricularia species

References

External links

Carnivorous plants of Central America
Carnivorous plants of North America
Carnivorous plants of South America
Flora of South America
juncea
Taxa named by Martin Vahl
Flora of North America